Kongnapa Watcharawit; is a Thai retired Muay Thai fighter. He is a former 4 divisions Rajadamnern Stadium champion.

Biography and career
Kongnapa started to train in Muay Thai at the age of 15 in a local camp of his native province. After 8 months of training he moved to the Kietpetchnoi gym in Bangkok. Known for his powerful hands, Kongnapa captured the Rajadamnern Stadium belt in four divisions between 1988 and 1995.

In the late 1990s Kongnapa moved to the United States where he became a trainer at Roufusport in Milwaukee, Wisconsin and kept competing on the local scene.

On December 4, 1998, Kongnapa faced Donnie Pendleton for the IKF Pro Muaythai World title. He won the fight by knockout with low kicks in the first round.

On November 19, 1999, Kongnapa defeated Steve Milles by knockout in a WKA event in New York.

On February 26, 2000, Kongnapa defended his IKF PRo Muay Thai World title against Dmitry Shakuta from Belarus. He won a highly contested fight by majority decision.

On November 10, 2000, Kongnapa regained the IKF Muay Thai World title he had involuntarily vacated when he defeated Pedro Villalobos by TKO in the second round.

On January 12, 2008 Kongnapa faced En Kang as a defense of his IKKC Muay Thai Intercontinental title at a WCK Muay Thai event. He lost the fight by doctor stoppage due to cuts in the fourth round.

Kongnapa is a trainer in the United States, when he resided in Las Vegas he trained former boxing world champion Riddick Bowe for his Muay Thai debut in 2013. Kongnapa later joined Coban's gym in New York and lives in Portland, Oregon as of 2022.

Titles and honours
Rajadamnern Stadium
 1988 Rajadamnern Stadium Super Bantamweight (122 lbs) Champion
 1989 Rajadamnern Stadium Featherweight (126 lbs) Champion (one defense)
 1991 Rajadamnern Stadium Super Featherweight (130 lbs) Champion
 1995 Rajadamnern Stadium Super Lightweight (140 lbs) Champion (one defense)
International Kickboxing Federation
 1998 I.K.F. Pro Muaythai Junior-middleweight World Champion (five defenses)
International Muay Thai Championship
 2001 I.M.T.C. Muay Thai Super Welterweight World −70 kg Champion
International Karate Kickboxing Council
 2007 IKKC Muay Thai Intercontinental Jr. Middleweight Champion

Fight record

|- bgcolor="#cfc"
| 2008-07-19 || Win ||align=left| Hector Pena|| WCK Muay Thai || Temecula, California, US || Decision (Split) || 5 || 3:00
|-
! style=background:white colspan=9 |

|- bgcolor="#fbb"
| 2008-01-12 || Loss ||align=left| En Kang|| WCK Muay Thai || Las Vegas, Nevada, US || TKO (Doctor stoppage/Cuts) || 4 || 
|-
! style=background:white colspan=9 |

|- bgcolor="#cfc"
| 2007-11-29 || Win ||align=left| Toby Grear || WCK Muay Thai || Highland, California, US || Decision (Unanimous)|| 5 || 3:00
|-
! style=background:white colspan=9 |

|- bgcolor="#cfc"
| 2002-10-11 || Win ||align=left| Jason Fenton|| || Atlanta, Georgia, US || KO (Low kicks) || 3 ||

|- bgcolor="#cfc"
| 2001-06-03 || Win ||align=left| Ole Laursen|| Warriors Cup 3 || Burbank, California, USA || Decision (Split) || 5 || 3:00
|-
! style=background:white colspan=9 |

|-  bgcolor="#cfc"
| 2000-11-10 || Win ||align=left| Pedro Villalobos || IKF: Muay Thai Uprising 1 || Atlanta, Georgia, US || TKO (Kicks + punches) || 2 || 1:54
|-
! style=background:white colspan=9 |

|-  bgcolor="#cfc"
| 2000-03-18 || Win ||align=left| Pascal Lafleur || ISKA: Wilson vs. Cooper || Las Vegas, Nevada, US || KO (Right hook)|| 1 || 2:40

|-  bgcolor="#cfc"
| 2000-02-26 || Win ||align=left| Dmitry Shakuta || Roufusport || Milwaukee, Wisconsin, US || Decision (Majority) || 5 || 3:00
|-
! style=background:white colspan=9 |

|-  bgcolor="#cfc"
| 1999-11-19 || Win ||align=left| Steve Milles || WKA || New York, USA || TKO (Doctor stoppage) || 3 ||

|-  bgcolor="#cfc"
| 1999-09-18 || Win ||align=left| Vadim Chamykin || Roufusport || Milwaukee, Wisconsin, US || KO || 2 || 1:53 
|-
! style=background:white colspan=9 |

|-  bgcolor="#cfc"
| 1999-05-01 || Win ||align=left| Jeremy Abbott || Roufusport || Milwaukee, Wisconsin, US || TKO (Elbows + knees) || 2 || 2:44

|-  bgcolor="#cfc"
| 1999-03-19 || Win ||align=left| Marcus Mangan || Roufusport || Milwaukee, Wisconsin, US || Decision (Unanimous) || 5 || 3:00 
|-
! style=background:white colspan=9 |

|-  bgcolor="#cfc"
| 1999-02-06 || Win ||align=left| Eval Denton || Roufusport || Milwaukee, Wisconsin, US || Decision (Unanimous) || 5 || 3:00 
|-
! style=background:white colspan=9 |

|-  bgcolor="#cfc"
| 1998-12-04 || Win ||align=left| Donnie Pendleton || Roufusport || Milwaukee, Wisconsin, US || KO (Low kick) || 1 || 
|-
! style=background:white colspan=9 |

|-  bgcolor="#cfc"
| 1998-10-24 || Win ||align=left| Ryan Jones || Roufusport || Milwaukee, Wisconsin, US || KO (Punch) || 1 ||

|-  bgcolor="#cfc"
| 1998-07-03 || Win ||align=left| Brian Lee || Las Vegas Fight Night 1998 || Las Vegas, Nevada, US || KO ||  ||

|-  bgcolor="#fbb"
| 1998-05-30 || Loss ||align=left| Khunpon Dechkampu || Roufusport || Milwaukee, Wisconsin, US|| KO (Elbow) || 3 || 1:21

|-  style="background:#fbb;"
| 1995-06-30|| Loss ||align=left| Sangtiennoi Sor.Rungroj || Lumpinee Stadium || Bangkok, Thailand || Decision || 5 || 3:00

|-  style="background:#fbb;"
| 1995-06-07 || Loss ||align=left| Pairot Wor.Wolapon || Rajadamnern Stadium || Bangkok, Thailand  || Decision  || 5 || 3:00

|- style="background:#cfc;"
| 1995-04-28 || Win ||align=left| Namkabuan Nongkeepahuyuth || Lumpinee Stadium || Bangkok, Thailand  || Decision || 5 || 3:00

|-  style="background:#cfc;"
| 1995-03-29 || Win ||align=left| Namphon Nongkeepahuyuth || Rajadamnern Stadium || Bangkok, Thailand || KO (High kick) || 5 ||

|-  style="background:#cfc;"
| 1995-03-02 || Win ||align=left| Saenkeng Pinsinchai || Rajadamnern Stadium || Bangkok, Thailand || Decision || 5 || 3:00
|-
! style=background:white colspan=9 |

|-  style="background:#cfc;"
| 1995-01-11 || Win ||align=left| Saenkeng Pinsinchai || Rajadamnern Stadium || Bangkok, Thailand || Decision (Unanimous) || 5 || 3:00
|-
! style=background:white colspan=9 |

|-  style="background:#fbb;"
| ? || Loss ||align=left| Den Muangsurin|| Lumpinee Stadium || Bangkok, Thailand || KO (Uppercut)|| 4 ||

|-  style="background:#fbb;"
| 1994-09-06 || Loss ||align=left| M16 Bor.Khor.Sor|| Lumpinee Stadium || Bangkok, Thailand || Decision || 5 || 3:00

|-  style="background:#cfc;"
| 1994-06-01 || Win ||align=left| M16 Bor.Khor.Sor || Rajadamnern Stadium || Bangkok, Thailand || Decision || 5 || 3:00

|-  style="background:#cfc;"
| 1994-05-03 || Win ||align=left| Chaksing Por.Rewadee || Rajadamnern Stadium || Bangkok, Thailand || Decision || 5 || 3:00

|-  style="background:#cfc;"
| 1994-03-29 || Win ||align=left| Namphon Nongkeepahuyuth || Lumpinee Stadium || Bangkok, Thailand || Decision || 5 || 3:00

|-  style="background:#cfc;"
| 1994-03-08 || Win ||align=left| Petchrung Sityasothon || Lumpinee Stadium || Bangkok, Thailand || KO (Punch)|| 2 ||

|-  style="background:#cfc;"
| 1994-02-09|| Win ||align=left| Chanchai Sor Tamarangsri || Rajadamnern Stadium  || Bangkok, Thailand || Decision || 5 || 3:00

|-  style="background:#fbb;"
| 1994-01-11|| Loss ||align=left| Pepsi Biyapan || Lumpinee Stadium  || Bangkok, Thailand || Decision || 5 || 3:00

|-  style="background:#cfc;"
| 1993-12-21|| Win ||align=left| Suwitlek Sor.Sakowarat || Lumpinee Stadium  || Bangkok, Thailand || Decision || 5 || 3:00

|-  style="background:#cfc;"
| 1993-11-19|| Win ||align=left| Rungrit Or.Samit || Lumpinee Stadium  || Bangkok, Thailand || Decision || 5 || 3:00

|-  style="background:#fbb;"
| 1993-10-20|| Loss ||align=left| Pepsi Biyapan || Rajadamnern Stadium  || Bangkok, Thailand || Decision || 5 || 3:00

|-  style="background:#cfc;"
| 1993-09-13|| Win ||align=left| Anangdet Por.Paoin || Rajadamnern Stadium  || Bangkok, Thailand || Decision || 5 || 3:00

|-  style="background:#cfc;"
| ? || Win ||align=left| Rungrit Or.Samit || Lumpinee Stadium  || Bangkok, Thailand || KO (High kick)|| 3 ||

|-  style="background:#fbb;"
| 1993-06-26 || Loss ||align=left| Taweechai Wor.Preecha || Rajadamnern Stadium || Bangkok, Thailand || Decision || 5 || 3:00

|-  style="background:#fbb;"
| 1992-01-15 || Loss ||align=left| Samsuek Chuwattana || Rajadamnern Stadium || Bangkok, Thailand || Decision || 5 || 3:00

|-  style="background:#fbb;"
| 1991-08-15 || Loss ||align=left| Jongrak Khaiadisorn || Rajadamnern Stadium || Bangkok, Thailand || Decision || 5 || 3:00
|-
! style=background:white colspan=9 |

|-  style="background:#;"
| 1991-06-26 ||  ||align=left| Jack Kiatniwat || Rajadamnern Stadium || Bangkok, Thailand || ||  ||

|-  style="background:#fbb;"
| 1991-06-10 || Loss ||align=left| Jongrak Khaiadisorn|| Rajadamnern Stadium || Bangkok, Thailand || Decision || 5 || 3:00
|-
! style=background:white colspan=9 |

|-  style="background:#cfc;"
| 1991-05-13 || Win ||align=left| Jack Kiatniwat || Rajadamnern Stadium || Bangkok, Thailand || Decision || 5 || 3:00

|-  style="background:#cfc;"
| 1991-04-07 || Win ||align=left| Taweechai Wor.Preecha || Rajadamnern Stadium || Bangkok, Thailand || KO (Left cross) || 2 ||

|-  style="background:#cfc;"
| 1991-02-04 || Win ||align=left| Prasongphet Sor Thammarangsi || Rajadamnern Stadium || Bangkok, Thailand || Decision (Unanimous) || 5 || 3:00
|-
! style=background:white colspan=9 |

|-  style="background:#;"
| 1990-12-26 || ||align=left| Prasongphet Sor Thammarangsi || Rajadamnern Stadium || Bangkok, Thailand || ||  ||

|-  style="background:#fbb;"
| 1990-11-23 || Loss ||align=left| Decha Sitabanchong || Lumpinee Stadium || Bangkok, Thailand || Decision || 5 || 3:00

|-  style="background:#cfc;"
| 1990-08-15 || Win ||align=left| Namphon Nongkeepahuyuth || Rajadamnern Stadium || Bangkok, Thailand || KO|| 1 ||

|-  style="background:#c5d2ea;"
| 1990-07-05 || Draw||align=left| Taweechai Wor.Preecha || Rajadamnern Stadium || Bangkok, Thailand || Decision || 5 || 3:00

|-  style="background:#fbb;"
| 1990-06-07 || Loss ||align=left| Jack Kiatniwat || Rajadamnern Stadium || Bangkok, Thailand || Decision || 5 || 3:00

|-  style="background:#cfc;" 
| 1990-05-02 || Win ||align=left| Prasongphet Sor Thammarangsi || Rajadamnern Stadium || Bangkok, Thailand || Decision || 5 || 3:00

|-  style="background:#fbb;"
| 1990-04-05 || Loss ||align=left| Taweechai Wor.Preecha ||Rajadamnern Stadium  || Bangkok, Thailand || Decision || 5 || 3:00

|-  style="background:#fbb;"
| 1990-02-01|| Loss ||align=left| Sangtiennoi Sor.Rungroj || Rajadamnern Stadium || Bangkok, Thailand || TKO || 3 ||

|-  style="background:#cfc;"
| 1989-12-21 || Win ||align=left| Chokdee Kiatphayathai || Rajadamnern Stadium || Bangkok, Thailand || Decision || 5 || 3:00

|- style="background:#fbb;"
| 1989-11-13 || Loss ||align=left| Jack Kiatniwat || Rajadamnern Stadium || Bangkok, Thailand || Decision (Unanimous) || 5 || 3:00
|-
! style=background:white colspan=9 |

|-  style="background:#cfc;"
| 1989-06-07 || Win ||align=left| Jomwo Chernyim || Rajadamnern Stadium || Bangkok, Thailand || Decision (Unanimous) || 5 || 3:00

|-  style="background:#cfc;"
| 1989-03-20 || Win ||align=left| Jomwo Chernyim || Rajadamnern Stadium || Bangkok, Thailand || Decision (Unanimous) || 5 || 3:00
|-
! style=background:white colspan=9 |

|-  style="background:#fbb;"
| 1989-02-22|| Loss ||align=left| Sangtiennoi Sor.Rungroj || Rajadamnern Stadium || Bangkok, Thailand || Decision || 5 || 3:00

|- style="background:#cfc;"
| 1989-01-15 || Win ||align=left| Panomtuanlek Hapalang || Crocodile Farm ||  Samut Prakan, Thailand  || KO (Punches) || 2 ||
|-
! style=background:white colspan=9 |

|-  style="background:#fbb;"
| 1988-10-19 || Loss ||align=left| Sangtiennoi Sor.Rungroj || Rajadamnern Stadium || Bangkok, Thailand || Decision || 5 || 3:00

|- style="background:#cfc;"
| 1988-08-29 || Win ||align=left| Sombat Sor.Thanikul || Rajadamnern Stadium || Bangkok, Thailand  || KO (Punch) || 4 ||

|- style="background:#c5d2ea;"
| 1988-08-04 || Draw||align=left| Sombat Sor.Thanikul ||  ||  Thailand  || Decision || 5 || 3:00

|- style="background:#cfc;"
| 1988-06-23 || Win ||align=left| Poolsawat Sitsornthong || Rajadamnern Stadium || Bangkok, Thailand  || Decision || 5 || 3:00

|- style="background:#cfc;"
| 1988-05-09 || Win ||align=left| Wanpichit Kaennorasing || Huamark Stadium || Bangkok, Thailand  || Decision || 5 || 3:00

|- style="background:#cfc;"
| 1988-03-24 || Win ||align=left| Dangnoi Lukprabat || Rajadamnern Stadium || Bangkok, Thailand  || KO || 3 ||
|-
! style=background:white colspan=9 |

|- style="background:#cfc;"
| 1988-02-08 || Win ||align=left| Kwanthong Kilenthong ||Rajadamnern Stadium || Bangkok, Thailand  || KO || 4 ||

|- style="background:#fbb;"
|1987-07-23
|Loss
| align="left" | Jampatong Na Nontachai
|Rajadamnern Stadium
|Bangkok, Thailand
|Decision
|5
|3:00

|- style="background:#cfc;"
| 1987-05-20 || Win ||align=left| Grandprixnoi Muangchaiyaphum || Rajadamnern Stadium || Bangkok, Thailand  || Decision || 5 || 3:00

|- style="background:#cfc;"
| 1987-03-12 || Win ||align=left| Kwangthong Singchawkeun || Rajadamnern Stadium || Bangkok, Thailand  || KO (Left hook) || 3 ||

|- style="background:#fbb;"
| 1987-01-16 || Loss ||align=left| Wanpichit Kaennorasing || Lumpinee Stadium || Bangkok, Thailand  || Decision || 5 || 3:00

|- style="background:#cfc;"
| 1985-07-05 || Win ||align=left| Chalamkaw Sor.Sonklin || Lumpinee Stadium || Bangkok, Thailand  || KO || 3 ||

|-
| colspan=9 | Legend:

References

1968 births
Living people
Kongnapa Watcharawit
Kongnapa Watcharawit